The Montenegrin Littoral (Montenegrin: Црногорско приморје/Crnogorsko primorje), historically known as the Littoral or the Maritime, is the littoral or coastline region of Montenegro which borders the Adriatic Sea. The littoral was lost to Austria and Turkey during its collapse due to Ottoman invasion - but it was regained in 1878 (Turkish-occupied portion) and 1918 (Austrian-occupied portion) following the Serbian-Montenegrin victories in the Russo-Turkish War and World War 1 respectively.

Geography

Kotor is part of the World Heritage Site dubbed the Natural and Culturo-Historical Region of Kotor.

History

Middle Ages
The region was part of Serbia in the Middle Ages. With the fall of the Serbian Empire, most of it was subsequently part of the Serbian Despotate. Zeta, in the hands of the Crnojevići lost its status of independent state, though vassal of Ottoman Empire, when it was added to territory of Sanjak of Scutari in 1499. In 1514 this territory was separated from the Sanjak of Scutari and established as separate Sanjak of Montenegro, under the rule of Skenderbeg Crnojević. When he died in 1528, the Sanjak of Montenegro was joined to the Sanjak of Scutari, as a unique administrative unit with certain degree of autonomy. The Republic of Venice had greatly expanded under the years (see Venetian Albania).

Modern history
The westernmost parts of the coastline were conquered by Napoleonic France in 1810. It was organized into the Cattaro subdélégation of the Illyrian Provinces (1811). In 1815 the same parts were taken by the Habsburg monarchy, and organized into Kingdom of Dalmatia.

Municipalities
The region includes following municipalities:
Herceg Novi Municipality
Tivat Municipality
Kotor Municipality
Budva Municipality
Bar Municipality
Ulcinj Municipality

Gallery

See also
Montenegro

References

Geographical regions of Montenegro
Geographic history of Montenegro
Economy of Montenegro
Tourism in Montenegro